Settlement may refer to:
Human settlement, a community where people live
Settlement (structural), the distortion or disruption of parts of a building
Closing (real estate), the final step in executing a real estate transaction
Settlement (finance), where securities are delivered against payment of money
Settlement (litigation), a resolution between disputing parties about a legal case
Settlement (trust), a deed whereby property is given by a settlor into trust
Israeli settlement, Jewish civilian communities built on land occupied by Israel

See also

Act of Settlement (disambiguation), various legislation
Settlement Act, or Poor Relief Act 1662
Collective settlement, another name for an intentional community
Collective settlement (litigation), a legal term
Settler colonialism, replacing the original population with a new society of settlers
Settlement geography, investigating the part of the earth's surface settled by humans
Settlement movement, a Victorian era reformist social movement
Settlement school, social reform institutions established in rural Appalachia in the early 20th century
Sedentism, the practice of living in one place for a long time
Squatting, occupying an abandoned building
Structured settlement, a negotiated financial or insurance arrangement 
Consolidation (soil), a process by which soils decrease in volume